Clancy Catholic College is an independent Roman Catholic comprehensive co-educational school located in West Hoxton, Australia. It is the partner school of University of Sydney.

History
The school was founded in 2005 by Cardinal Edward Clancy AC. The college was officially started in 2006 with a group of 55 students. It has been one of the top schools in the Sydney Catholic Schools

References

Catholic schools in New South Wales
University of Sydney
2005 establishments in Australia
Educational institutions established in 2005